OMG (Oh, My Girl!) is a 2009 Filipino romantic comedy film produced by Regal Entertainment and directed by Ploning helmer Dante Nico Garcia. The film is about friendship and love in the entertainment industry.

Judy Ann Santos stars as the famous actress named Darling, who was known in her childhood days as Opao. Ogie Alcasid plays Biboy, Darling's long-lost childhood friend who disguised as her aunt in order to meet her again.

Many of Santos' and Alcasid's friends in showbusiness are expected to appear in cameo roles, most notably Regine Velasquez (who conceptualized the film's story and also her first appearance in a Regal movie) and Sharon Cuneta (in her first appearance in a Regal movie).

Plot
Little Opao (Dorothy Ann Perez) and Biboy (Jairus Aquino) grew up together in an orphanage in Taal, Batangas and promised themselves to be best friends forever. As they grow older they head into separate ways; to be adopted by their respective new parents. Opao is adopted by a spinster (Carmi Martin) whose failed career in acting prompts her to mould Opao into a superstar with the nickname Darling. Meanwhile, Biboy is adopted by Crisp Pops (Roderick Paulate).

As Biboy (Ogie Alcasid) grows up as adult he opens a handphone service and repair shop and hopes to meet Opao (Judy Ann Santos) one day. One day Biboy sees Opao singing on television and realizes she has completely changed into a superstar! A twist of fate makes Biboy disguising himself as a girl to be Darlings assistant with a new name of Frida. Both become best of friends without Darling realizing her real identity.

Darling then finds companionship with her new love, Bambam (Jon Avila). The jealous Frida then helps Darling to remember about her young childhood memories. Once again Fridas real identity has not been revealed. One day Bambam gives a surprise to Darling and Opao must decide whether to hide his identity forever or reveal the truth before he loses his childhood dreamgirl to Bambam.

Cast
 Judy Ann Santos as Darling/Opao
 Ogie Alcasid as Biboy/Frida
 Sharon Cuneta as Guada (Cameo Role)
 Regine Velasquez as production assistant (Cameo Role)
 Manilyn Reynes as Tala
 Roderick Paulate as Crisp Pops
 Carmi Martin as Inday Langging
 Nova Villa as Sita
 John Prats as Bob
 Jon Avila as Bambam
 Jairus Aquino as Young Biboy
 Dorothy Ann Perez as Young Opao/Darling
 Frenchy Dy as Tunganga
 John Lapus as himself
 Jeffrey Santos as a gay friend
 Rez Cortez as gay friend
 Rufa Mae Quinto as Mayette (Cameo Role)
 Maureen Larrazabal as Joyce (Cameo Role)
 Diego Llorico as Marddie (Cameo Role)
 Noel Vincent P. Miguel as Camera Dept.
 Jason Abalos as Pedicab Driver (Cameo Role)
 German Moreno† as himself 
 Michael V. as himself 
 Rainier Castillo as Inday Langging and Crisp Pops's boyfriend
 Chokoleit† as Toll Gay
 Ketchup Eusebio as Assistant Director

References

External links
http://www.regalmultimedia.net/omg/

2009 films
2009 romantic comedy films
2000s Tagalog-language films
Regal Entertainment films
Philippine romantic comedy films